The Safavid–Portuguese war took place from 1507 to 1622 and involved the Portuguese Empire and the Kingdom of Ormus, its vassal, on one side, and the Safavid Persia (Iran) with the help of the Kingdom of England on the other side. During this era, Portugal established its rule for about more than a century in Ormuz and  more than 80 years in Bahrain, capturing some other islands and ports such as Qeshm and Bandar Abbas. The conflict came to an end when the Persian Shah, Abbas the Great, conquered the Portuguese Bahrain forcing them to war in the Persian Gulf.

In September 1507, the Portuguese Afonso de Albuquerque landed on the Hormoz. Portugal occupied Ormuz from 1515 to 1622. As a vassal of the Portuguese state, the Kingdom of Ormus jointly participated in the 1521 invasion of Bahrain that ended Jabrid rule of the Persian Gulf archipelago.

After the Portuguese made several abortive attempts to seize control of Basra, the Pasha asked for protection  against the Safavid ruler Abbas I, from then on Portuguese stayed in the city and region  as traders with a factory (feitoria) and as protector allied army. Later in 1622 the Safavid conquered Ormus with the help of the English, and tried to expel the Portuguese from the rest of the Persian Gulf, with the exception of the Oman gulf. The Portuguese were for the next decades  as allies of Afrasiyab, the Pasha of Basra, against the Safavids who failed several times to conquer the city of Basra.

Capture of Ormuz by Portuguese

The capture of Ormuz was a result of a plan by the king of Portugal, Manuel I, who in 1505 had resolved to thwart Muslim trade in the Indian Ocean by capturing Aden, to block trade through Alexandria; Ormuz, to block trade through Beirut; and Malacca to control trade with China. A fleet under Tristão da Cunha was sent to capture the Muslim fort on Socotra in order to control the entrance to the Red Sea; this was accomplished in 1507. The main part of the fleet then left for India, with a few ships remaining under Albuquerque.

Albuquerque disobeyed orders and left to capture the island of Ormuz. He obtained the submission of the local king to the king of Portugal, as well as the authorisation to build a fort using local labour. He started to build a fort on 27 October 1507, and initially planned to man it with a garrison, but could not hold it because of local resistance and the defection to India of several of his Portuguese captains.

Capture of Bahrain
As a vassal of the Portuguese state, the Kingdom of Ormus jointly participated in the 1521 invasion of Bahrain that ended Jabrid rule of the Bahrain archipelago. The Jabrid ruler was nominally a vassal of Ormus, but the Jabrid King, Muqrin ibn Zamil, had refused to pay the tribute Ormus demanded, prompting the invasion under the command of the Portuguese conqueror, António Correia. In the fighting for Bahrain, most of the combat was carried out by Portuguese troops, while the Ormusi admiral, Reis Xarafo, looked on. The Portuguese ruled Bahrain through a series of Ormusi governors. However, the Sunni Ormusi were not popular with Bahrain's Shia population which suffered religious disadvantages, prompting rebellion. In one case, the Ormusi governor was crucified by rebels, and Portuguese rule came to an end in 1602 after the Ormusi governor, who was a relative of the Ormusi king, started executing members of Bahrain's leading families.

Persian reconquest

By the order of Abbas I, in 1602, the Persian army under the command of Imam-Quli Khan, managed to expel the Portuguese from Bahrain.

In 1612, the Portuguese Empire took the city of Gamrūn and transliterated the name to Comorão. Almost two years later (in 1615), Comorão was taken by Abbās the Great after a naval battle with the Portuguese and renamed Bandar-e ‘Abbās, or "Port of ‘Abbās". In 1622, with the help of four English ships, Abbas retook Hormuz from the Portuguese in the Capture of Ormuz.

In 1622 when the Safavids retook Hormuz, the Portuguese Empire was one of the largest and most powerful empires in the world. The defeat of the Portuguese had many consequences including defeat in the Mombasa war and the capture of Fort Jesus by the Imam of Muscat, supported by the Persian king.

With the Arab/Baluchi seizure of Portugal's key foothold at Fort Jesus on Mombasa Island (now in Kenya) in 1698, the Portuguese Empire declined and lost most of its land in east Africa to the British. The British recognised the Persian Empire as the only sovereign of the entire Persian Gulf and it was mentioned in article 5 of the Preliminary Treaty of Friendship and Alliance in 1809. This recognition would be modified in subsequent negotiations including the Definitive Treaty of Friendship and Alliance, 1812, and the Treaty of Tehran, 1814, and remained the framework of Anglo–Persian relations over the next half century.

References 

Wars involving Safavid Iran
Wars involving Portugal
Military history of England
Military history of Portugal
Iran–Portugal military relations
Warfare of the Early Modern period